Arturo Boiocchi (7 October 1888 – 1964) was an Italian professional footballer who played as a striker.

At club level he played for U.S. Milanese for 15 years.

At international level he played in the first ever game of the Italy national football team on 15 May 1910, against France.

External links
 

1888 births
1964 deaths
Italian footballers
Italy international footballers
Association football forwards